Araçatuba–Dario Guarita State Airport  is the airport serving Araçatuba, Brazil.

It is operated by ASP.

History
Dario Guarita Airport was renovated in 1991.

On July 15, 2021, the concession of the airport was auctioned to the Consorcium Aeroportos Paulista (ASP), comprised by companies Socicam and Dix. The airport was previously operated by DAESP.

Airlines and destinations

Accidents and incidents
7 October 1983: a TAM Airlines Embraer EMB 110C Bandeirante registration PP-SBH flying from Campo Grande and Urubupungá to Araçatuba struck the ground just short of the runway threshold after missing the approach at Araçatuba Airport twice. Seven crew and passengers died.

Access

See also

List of airports in Brazil

References

External links

Airports in São Paulo (state)